The 1972–73 Romanian Hockey League season was the 43rd season of the Romanian Hockey League. Four teams participated in the league, and Dinamo Bucuresti won the championship.

Regular season

External links
hochei.net

Rom
Romanian Hockey League seasons
Rom